November gale, the Witch of November, or November Witch, refers to the strong winds that frequently blow across the Great Lakes in autumn. The "witches" are caused by intense low atmospheric pressure over the Great Lakes pulling cold Canadian/Arctic air from the north or northwest and warm Gulf air from the south. When these cold and warm air masses collide, they can result in hurricane force winds that stir up large waves on the lakes.

Gordon Lightfoot's song "The Wreck of the Edmund Fitzgerald" makes reference to the Witch of November: the storm that wrecked the Edmund Fitzgerald was 978 mbar, equivalent to a borderline Category 1/2 hurricane. Similar witches have caused numerous shipwrecks over the years. Another storm that hit in November 1998 was 967 mbar, equivalent to a solid Category 2 hurricane. A still stronger storm, of October 2010, brought Minnesota and Wisconsin record low barometric pressures of, respectively, 954.96 and 961.06 mbar (both equivalent to a category 3 hurricane on the Saffir-Simpson scale) and lashed Duluth with 81 mph wind gusts and 19-foot seas during the night of October 26–27, 2010.

References and notes

See also
List of storms on the Great Lakes
Meteorological explanation for the formation of a November gale
Mishipeshu

Great Lakes
November events
Winds